The Randell Cottage Writers' Residency is a literary residency in New Zealand. It is awarded annually to one New Zealand writer and one French writer, comprising six months' rent-free accommodation at Randell Cottage in Wellington and a stipend ( set at 27,450). The recipients are usually mid-career writers. The cottage itself is listed with Heritage New Zealand.

History
The residency is based at Randell Cottage in the suburb of Thorndon, Wellington. The cottage was built in 1868 by William Randell, the great-grandfather of children's author Beverley Randell. He and his wife Sarah raised their 10 children at the cottage. After seventy years of the cottage being owned by other families, Beverley and her husband, Hugh Price, bought the cottage in 1994 and restored it to how it had been at the time of William's ownership. 

In 2002, on the suggestion of her daughter Susan Price, Beverley Randell decided to gift the cottage to a trust for the purpose of setting up a writers' residency. The plan was partly inspired by an attempt to set up a similar residency in memory of the poet Lauris Edmond, which had been unsuccessful. It was the first dedicated writers' residency in Wellington. In part, the residency reciprocates the Katherine Mansfield Menton Fellowship, which provides a residency based in France for New Zealand writers. The trust is supported by Creative New Zealand, the New Zealand–France Friendship Fund and the Wellington City Council.

Kirsty Gunn, 2009 writer-in-residence, described the cottage:

Caroline Laurent, the 2021 French recipient, was unable to take up the residency during the year due to COVID-19 border restrictions.

Heritage registration

Randell Cottage was registered by the New Zealand Historic Places Trust (now Heritage New Zealand) on 14 December 1995. The building has a Category II classification. The registration covers the building and the section it is placed on and the rationale for the listing was the "historical and cultural heritage significance and value". Some of the household items uncovered during the restoration of the cottage are held at Te Papa.

Writers-in-residence
The recipients of the residency have been:

References

External links 
 Official website
 "Saving Randell Cottage", video about the restoration of the cottage featuring Beverley Randell and her daughter Susan Price
 "A tour around Randell Cottage, Thorndon, Wellington", video tour by Michalia Arathimos during her residency

New Zealand literary awards
2002 establishments in New Zealand
Awards established in 2002
France–New Zealand relations